Network Identity and Time Zone (NITZ) is a mechanism for provisioning local time and date, time zone and daylight saving time (DST) offset, as well as network provider identity information, to mobile devices via a wireless network.

History
NITZ has been an optional part of the official GSM standard since phase 2+ release 96.

NITZ is often used to automatically update the system clock of mobile phones.

In terms of standards and other timing or network access protocols such as NTP or CDMA2000, the quality and enforcement of NITZ is weak. This standard allows the network to "transfer its current identity, universal time, DST and LTZ" but each is optional, and support across RAN vendor and operator varies.  This presents a problem for device manufacturers, who are required to maintain a complex time zone database, rather than rely on the network operator.  Additionally, unlike 3GPP2, which transmits GPS-sourced, millisecond resolution time via the sync channel, for NITZ, the "accuracy of the time information is in the order of minutes".  The optional nature of the delivery mechanism results in issues for users in regions that don't practice daylight saving but which share a time zone with a region that does.
Most modern handsets have their own internal time zone software and will automatically perform a daylight saving advance.
Because the NITZ delivery is not usually periodic but dependent on the handset crossing radio network boundaries, these handsets can be displaying incorrect time for many hours or even days before a NITZ update arrives and corrects them.

Carriers supporting NITZ 
Initial list derived from ref:

References 

GSM standard